Esporte Clube Igrejinha, commonly referred to as Igrejinha, is a Brazilian football club based in Igrejinha, Rio Grande do Sul. It currently plays in Campeonato Gaúcho Série A2, the second level of the Rio Grande do Sul state football league.

History
The club was founded on April 26, 1930. They won the Campeonato Gaúcho Third Level in 1968 and in 1980.

Achievements
 Campeonato Gaúcho Third Level:
Winners (2): 1968, 1980

Stadium
Esporte Clube Igrejinha play their home games at Estádio Carlos Alberto Schwingler. The stadium has a maximum capacity of 3,000 people.

References

Association football clubs established in 1930
Football clubs in Rio Grande do Sul
1930 establishments in Brazil